The men's 4 x 100 metres relay event at the 2009 European Athletics U23 Championships was held in Kaunas, Lithuania, at S. Dariaus ir S. Girėno stadionas (Darius and Girėnas Stadium) on 19 July.

Medalists

Results

Final
19 July

Heats
19 July
Qualified: first 3 in each heat and 2 to the Final

Heat 1

Heat 2

Participation
According to an unofficial count, 40 athletes from 10 countries participated in the event.

 (4)
 (4)
 (4)
 (4)
 (4)
 (4)
 (4)
 (4)
 (4)
 (4)

References

4 x 100 metres relay
Relays at the European Athletics U23 Championships